Geisenhausen is a municipality with market town status in the district of Landshut, in Bavaria, Germany. It is situated 14 km southeast of Landshut in the valley of the Kleine Vils.

History 
Geisenhausen was first mentioned in a document in 980 and received market rights in 1393.

Administrative division 
Albanstetten
Diemannskirchen
Hörlkam
Hermannskirchen
Holzhausen
Geisenhausen
Salksdorf
Johannesbergham
Westersbergham
Stephansbergham
Irlach

Sights 
The parish church St. Martin from the second half of the 15th century is a brick building in gothic style similar to its larger namesake in Landshut. Historic middle-class houses line part of market square and main road. The church of St. Theobald was a destiny of pilgrimages from about 1390 to 1790.

Infrastructure 
Geisenhausen is linked with the rail system of the Deutsche Bahn. The Bundesstraße 299, an important road, bypasses the market town.

Periodic events 
Rosenmontagszug (Rose Monday Parade) of the carnival club Tollemogei
Farmers' market
Fair of the Bürger- und Gewerbeverein (citizens and business association) at the weekend of Whitsun

Famous citizens 
 Günter Eich (1907-1972), writer
 Martin Flörchinger (1909–2004), actor
 Thomas Schmid (1960), writer
 Johannes Schmid (1973), stage director

References

External links 
 

Landshut (district)